The lovely poison frog or lovely poison-arrow frog (Phyllobates lugubris) is a species of frog in the family Dendrobatidae. It is found on the Caribbean versant of Central America from southeastern Nicaragua through Costa Rica to northwestern Panama, with one record just west of the Panama Canal. Populations from the Pacific versant, formerly included in this species, are now identified as Phyllobates vittatus.

Description
Adult males measure  and females  in snout–vent length. Maxillary teeth are present. The dorsum is black with a pair of dorsolateral stripes, typically pale yellow to gold or orange, running along the sides of the dorsum from near the hindlimbs to the snout. The limbs are usually mottled with yellow–greenish yellow. The ventral surfaces are mottled with extensive black pigment, often to an extent that gives nearly solid black appearance. While P. lugubris is normally toxic like other related species, some populations in Central America are not known to be toxic.

Habitat and conservation
It can also occur in secondary growth and plantations. It is diurnal and terrestrial. Adult frogs are often found by rocky sections of forest streams. Eggs are laid in dry leaf-litter. The hatching tadpoles are transported by males to forest streams to complete the larval development.

General habitat loss and pollution are potential threats to this species. Chytrid fungus, Batrachochytrium dendrobatidis, has been detected in museum specimens but its impact on natural populations is unknown. Phyllobates lugubris is sometimes present in the pet trade, with some illegal collection occurring. It is listed in the CITES Appendix II. It is present in several protected areas.

References

Phyllobates
Amphibians of Costa Rica
Amphibians of Nicaragua
Amphibians of Panama
Taxa named by Eduard Oscar Schmidt
Amphibians described in 1857
Taxonomy articles created by Polbot